Kvibille is a locality situated in Halmstad Municipality, Halland County, Sweden, with 974 inhabitants in 2020.

Sports
The following sports clubs are located in Kvibille:

 Kvibille BK

References

External links
 

Populated places in Halmstad Municipality